The 1942–43 season was Manchester United's fourth season in the non-competitive War League during the Second World War.

Many of Manchester United's players went off to fight in the war, but for those who remained, the Football League organised a special War League.

War League North Regional League First Championship

War League North Regional League Second Championship

References

Manchester United F.C. seasons
Manchester United